Wagner is a census-designated place located in Decatur Township, Mifflin County in the state of Pennsylvania, United States.  It is located along U.S. Route 522 in eastern Mifflin County, north of Shade Mountain.  As of the 2010 census the population was 128 residents.

References

Census-designated places in Mifflin County, Pennsylvania
Census-designated places in Pennsylvania